Krka may refer to:

Places:
 Krka, Ivančna Gorica, a settlement in the Municipality of Ivančna Gorica, Slovenia.
 Gurk, Carinthia, known as Krka in Slovene

Rivers:
 Krka (Croatia), a tributary of the Adriatic Sea in Croatia
 Krka (Sava), a tributary of the Sava in Slovenia
 Krka (Una), a tributary of the Una in Bosnia and Herzegovina
 Kerka (Slovene: Krka), formed by the Big Krka (Velika Krka) and Little Krka (Mala Krka), a tributary of the Ledava in Hungary
 Gurk (river) (Slovene: Krka), a tributary of the Drava in Austria

Sports
 BC Krka, a basketball club from Novo Mesto
 NK Krka a football club from Novo Mesto
 MRK Krka, a handball club from Novo Mesto

Other:
 Sanjak of Krka, a province (sanjak) of the Ottoman Empire, during the 16th and 17th centuries
 Krka National Park in Croatia
 Krka monastery, a medieval Orthodox monastery in Croatia
 Krka (company), a pharmaceutical company in Novo Mesto, Slovenia, named after the Slovene river
 KRKA (FM), a radio station (103.9 FM) licensed to serve Severance, Colorado, United States
 KRKA, former callsign of KHXT, an FM radio station in Erath, Louisiana, USA

See also
 Gurk (disambiguation)